The men's 400 metre freestyle was a swimming event held as part of the swimming at the 1912 Summer Olympics programme. It was the third appearance of the event, which had been introduced in 1904. The competition was held from Thursday July 11, 1912 to Sunday July 14, 1912.

Twenty-six swimmers from 13 nations competed.

Records

These were the standing world and Olympic records (in minutes) prior to the 1912 Summer Olympics.

In the first heat Harold Hardwick set a new Olympic record with 5:36.0 minutes. In the fifth heat Cecil Healy improved the Olympic record with 5:34.0 minutes. In the first semi-final George Hodgson set a world record with 5:25.4 minutes and in the final he improved his record again with 5:24.4 minutes.

Results

Quarterfinals

The top two in each heat advanced along with the fastest loser overall.

Heat 1

Heat 2

Heat 3

Heat 4

Heat 5

Heat 6

Semifinals

The top two from each heat and the faster of the two third place swimmers advanced.

Semifinal 1

Semifinal 2

Final

References

Notes
 
 

Swimming at the 1912 Summer Olympics
Men's events at the 1912 Summer Olympics